Lazar Romanić (born 25 March 1998) is a Serbian professional footballer who plays as a winger for Greek Super League club Lamia.

Club career

Red Star Belgrade
Born in Kragujevac to Croatian Serb parents who fled Knin, Croatia during Operation Storm, Romanić is a product of Red Star Belgrade youth system. After remarkable games in youth team, he signed his first three-year professional contract with the club on 27 October 2016. At the end of the year, Romanić was nominated for the best youth player in the club academy. He has also been called into the first team, passing the winter break-off season with senior members. For the rest of season, Romanić was loaned to the Serbian First League side OFK Beograd, but also stayed playing with youth team on dual registration. Romanić scored his first senior goal on 9 April 2017 in the 21 fixture match of 2016–17 between Budućnost Dobanovci and OFK Beograd. Although he was Italian side Carpi in summer 2017, Romanić moved at one-year loan deal to Borac Čačak.

Lamia
On 30 August 2018, Romanić moves to Lamia as a free agent from Red Star Belgrade, which kept a resale rate of 30%.

International career
Romanić got a first call into the Serbia U18 level in October 2015 under coach Ivan Tomić. He his debut for Serbia national under-19 football team on 1 September 2016 in a match against the United States, played on the memorial tournament "Stevan Vilotić - Ćele". Romanić scored his first goal for the team in a friendly match against Bulgaria on 23 February 2017.

Career statistics

Club

References

External links

1998 births
Living people
Sportspeople from Kragujevac
Association football forwards
Serbian footballers
Serbia youth international footballers
Red Star Belgrade footballers
OFK Beograd players
FK Borac Čačak players
PAS Lamia 1964 players
Serbian First League players
Serbian SuperLiga players
Super League Greece players
Serbian expatriate footballers
Serbian expatriate sportspeople in Greece
Expatriate footballers in Greece